Gillian Elizabeth Thomas (born 10 August 1953) is a Welsh actress, singer, and comedian. Early in her career she was known as Gillian Elisa Thomas.

Early life and education
Elisa was born in Carmarthen, Wales, and brought up in Lampeter; she began acting before she started school. As a sixth-former at Ysgol Gyfun Llanbedr-Pont Steffan in Lampeter, she co-wrote a Welsh-language musical, Yr Enfys (The Rainbow). After leaving school, she studied at the Welsh College of Music and Drama in Cardiff.

Career 
In 1975, she was chosen by producer Endaf Emlyn to play the lead in a Welsh-language rock opera. Since that time, she has been a well-known figure on Welsh-language television.

On S4C television, she played (1974–2010) the part of Sabrina Daniels in the long-running soap Pobol y Cwm and the comic character "Mrs O.T.T." in the variety entertainment programme Noson Lawen. She appeared in the gangster drama series Y Pris. She has performed one-woman comedy shows at the Edinburgh Festival. As a singer, she has completed three albums of new and traditional Welsh songs – Rhywbeth yn y Glas, Haul ar Nos Hir, and Lawr Y Lein, as well as appearing on a number of other recordings.

She is best known to English-speaking audiences for her leading role in the 2018 drama series Hidden, which was filmed in both Welsh and English, Elisa travelled around Wales with fellow actress Ruth Jones as part of the Welsh language show Iath Ar Daith, which shows celebrities learning the Welsh and putting it to practice.

Filmography

Film

Television

References

External links
 
 Official website 
 Chortle: Gillian Elisa With Jo's Heatwave
 Equity Wales: Gillian Elisa

1953 births
Alumni of the Royal Welsh College of Music & Drama
Living people
People from Carmarthen
Welsh musical theatre actresses
20th-century Welsh women singers
Welsh-speaking actors
Welsh television actresses
Welsh women comedians
People from Lampeter